Øystein Øvretveit (born 25 June 1994) is a Norwegian footballer who plays as a goalkeeper for Jerv.

Club career

Early life
Øvretveit started his youth career at his local side Telavåg, later playing for a cooperation team of Skogsvåg and Hald. Ahead of the 2009 season, he made his big move to Brann's youth system. Øvretveit signed a professional contract with Brann on 9 February 2011, which allowed him to play in league and cup matches for the first team. A successful year with the youth team culminated in an appearance in the Norwegian under-19 Championship.

On 18 November 2011, Øvretveit was taken out of training for an indefinite period after doctors found an irregular heartbeat in routine cardiac checks. Despite being unsure of whether he had a future in football at all, he was cleared to train again by his doctors on 19 January 2012 when it was found that his problem was only temporary.

Senior career
Øvretveit's ambition ahead of the 2012 season was to establish himself as Brann 2's first-choice goalkeeper. But with the regular substitute goalkeeper Jørgen Mohus out injured, Øvretveit started the 2012 season on the bench. In the season opener against Rosenborg, injury forced Piotr Leciejewski to come off as a first-half substitute, allowing Øvretveit to come on for his professional debut. He became Brann's youngest goalkeeper in the Premier League, taking the record from his current goalkeeper-coach Dan Riisnes.

On 16 May, Leciejewski was again injured and Øvretveit replaced him in Brann's 5–0 victory against Sogndal. In the next match, he started his first league match, away against Aalesund. Although he conceding two goals, his performance was praised by Aalesund's coach Kjetil Rekdal, who stated that it wasn't Øvretveit's fault that Brann lost.

Øvretveit joined Vard Haugesund on a one-month loan-deal 14 June 2013 to get match-training, and played three matches for the club in the First Division during his spell.

Øvretveit joined Nest-Sotra on loan.

Career statistics

References

External links

1994 births
Living people
People from Hordaland
Norwegian footballers
SK Brann players
SK Vard Haugesund players
Nest-Sotra Fotball players
Sandefjord Fotball players
FK Jerv players
Eliteserien players
Norwegian First Division players
Norwegian Second Division players
Association football goalkeepers
Sportspeople from Vestland